Ángel Eloy Campos Cleque (born 31 May 1942) is a former Peruvian football defender, who played for the Peru national football team between 1963 and 1972, gaining 46 caps. He was part of Peru's squad for the 1960 Summer Olympics and the 1970 World Cup. At club level, Campos spent most of his career at Sporting Cristal.

References

External links
 
 

1942 births
Living people
People from Ica, Peru
Peruvian footballers
Association football defenders
Peru international footballers
Olympic footballers of Peru
Footballers at the 1960 Summer Olympics
1970 FIFA World Cup players
Sporting Cristal footballers
Sporting Cristal managers
Peruvian football managers